Junior is the third studio album by Norwegian electronic music duo Röyksopp. It was released on 18 March 2009 by Wall of Sound. Prior to its official release, the album was made available for listening on the duo's website on 13 March 2009.

Background and history
The album features guest vocals from Scandinavian singers Robyn, Karin Dreijer, Lykke Li and Anneli Drecker.

Junior debuted at number 21 on the UK Albums Chart, selling 10,378 copies in its first week. By September 2010, the album had sold 36,239 copies in the United Kingdom. The album's lead single, "Happy Up Here", premiered on 9 January 2009 on Pete Tong's Essential Selection on BBC Radio 1, and was officially released on 19 January. "The Girl and the Robot", which features Swedish singer Robyn, was released on 15 June 2009 as the album's second single. "This Must Be It" features Dreijer and was released on 23 October 2009 as the third single.

Use in media
"It's What I Want" was included as a part of the official soundtrack of EA Sports video game, FIFA 10. "Röyksopp Forever" was also used in the background of the Flashforward Channel 5 promos during September 2009 and used as backing music on The X Factor 2009 in live shows. An instrumental version of "Vision One" was licensed for use in the video game LittleBigPlanet 2. "This Must Be It" was included in the soundtrack to the 2011 comedy film Hall Pass.

Critical reception

Junior received generally positive reviews from music critics. At Metacritic, which assigns a normalised rating out of 100 to reviews from mainstream publications, the album received an average score of 74, based on 21 reviews, which indicates "generally favorable reviews". The album was placed at number 30 on Pitchforks Top 50 Albums of 2009, number 19 on Popjustice's The Top 33 Albums of 2009 and number 21 on Mixmags Top 50 Albums of 2009.

Track listing

Notes
 "Happy Up Here" contains a sample of "Do That Stuff" by Parliament.
 "Vision One" is an English-language version of Röyksopp's remix of "Sing a Song" by Eri Nobuchika.
 "Röyksopp Forever" contains a sample of "Suites for My Lady" by Skylark.

Personnel
Credits adapted from the liner notes of Junior.

 Röyksopp – production, mastering ; vocals ; string arrangements, strings ; vocoded mystique ; backing vocals ; bass 
 Robyn – vocals 
 Anneli Drecker – backing vocals ; vocals 
 Davide Rossi – string arrangements, strings 
 Karin Dreijer Andersson – vocals 
 Kato Ådland – bass 
 Lindy Fay Hella – additional vocals 
 Lykke Li – vocals 
 Ole Vegard Skauge – bass 
 Mike Marsh – mastering
 Stian Andersen – cover photography
 Leslie David – drawings, artwork

Charts

Weekly charts

Year-end charts

Release history

References

2009 albums
Astralwerks albums
Röyksopp albums
Virgin Records albums
Wall of Sound (record label) albums